"I've Got a Thing About You Baby" is a song by Tony Joe White, released in 1972 as a single from his album The Train I'm On. It was notably covered by Elvis Presley.

Track listing

Elvis Presley version 

Elvis Presley covered this song in 1974 and released it as the B-side to "Take Good Care of Her".

His version reached number 33 in the UK.

Track listing

Charts 

Elvis with The Royal Philharmonic Orchestra version

References

External links 

 I've Got a Thing About You, Baby on the Elvis Presley official website

1972 songs
1972 singles
1974 singles
Elvis Presley songs
Warner Records singles
RCA Records singles
Songs written by Tony Joe White
